Mangelia albilonga is a species of sea snail, a marine gastropod mollusk in the family Mangeliidae.

Description

Distribution
This species occurs in the Atlantic Ocean off Angola.

References

 Rolán, E., and J. Otero-Schmitt. "The family Turridae s.l. (Mollusca, Neogastropoda) in Angola, 2. subfamily Mangeliinae Fischer, 1883." Argonauta 13.1 (1999): 5–526

External links
  Tucker, J.K. 2004 Catalog of recent and fossil turrids (Mollusca: Gastropoda). Zootaxa 682:1–11295
 
 MHN Catálogo do Museo de Historia Natural: Mangelia albilonga 
 MNHN, Paris : Mangelia albilonga (holotype)

Endemic fauna of Angola
albilonga
Gastropods described in 1999